Mouroukou Farras Bamba (born 3 February 1996), is a French professional footballer who last played for ViOn Zlaté Moravce as a midfielder.

Club career

FC ViOn Zlaté Moravce
He made his professional debut for ViOn Zlaté Moravce against ŽP Šport Podbrezová on 15 August 2015.

References

External links
 Futbalnet profile
 Fortuna Liga profile
 

1996 births
Living people
French footballers
Association football midfielders
FC ViOn Zlaté Moravce players
Slovak Super Liga players
Expatriate footballers in Slovakia
French expatriate sportspeople in Slovakia